In the 1867 Iowa State Senate elections, Iowa voters elected state senators to serve in the twelfth Iowa General Assembly. Following the expansion of the Iowa Senate from 48 to 49 seats in 1867, elections were held for 34 of the state senate's 49 seats. State senators serve four-year terms in the Iowa State Senate.

The general election took place on October 8, 1867.

Following the previous election in 1865, Republicans had control of the Iowa Senate with 42 seats to Democrats' six seats.

To claim control of the chamber from Republicans, the Democrats needed to net 19 Senate seats.

Republicans maintained control of the Iowa State Senate following the election with the balance of power shifting to Republicans holding 40 seats, Democrats having eight seats, and a lone seat for the People's Party (a net gain of 2 seats for Democrats and 1 seat for the People's Party).

Summary of Results 
 Note: The holdover Senators not up for re-election are not listed on this table.

Source:

Detailed Results
NOTE: The Iowa General Assembly does not provide detailed vote totals for Iowa State Senate elections in 1867.

See also
 Elections in Iowa

External links
District boundaries were redrawn before the 1867 general election for the Iowa Senate:
Iowa Senate Districts 1866-1867 map
Iowa Senate Districts 1868-1869 map

References

Iowa Senate
Iowa
Iowa Senate elections